Ricardo Nuno dos Santos Nunes (born 18 June 1986) is a South African former professional footballer who played as a left back.

Club career
The son of Portuguese parents, Nunes was born in Johannesburg, South Africa, and moved to Portugal, where he started playing football. He first appeared for G.D. Estoril Praia, joining the club at the age of 12.

After emerging through S.L. Benfica's youth system – he only played for its reserves, spending the 2005–06 campaign in the third division – Nunes continued playing as a senior in the lower leagues of Greece and Cyprus. It was in Cyprus where he had his first taste of top-flight football, appearing in the First Division for AEP Paphos FC and Olympiakos Nicosia.

On 31 January 2012, after one and a half seasons in the Portuguese Segunda Liga, Nunes signed a two-and-a-half-year contract with MŠK Žilina. In February 2014 he moved clubs and countries again, joining Bulgaria's PFC Levski Sofia until June 2015.

Nunes signed with Pogoń Szczecin of the Polish Ekstraklasa in 2014, and made 153 competitive appearances over a six-year spell.

International career
Although Nunes was born in South Africa, he represented Portugal at under-17 level. This meant that he required permission from FIFA before he could switch allegiance to South Africa, after he had spoken with Gordon Igesund.

In early October 2012, Nunes was named in the South Africa squad for friendlies against Poland and Kenya. During this announcement, Igesund said that "Nunes is a very exciting player" and that he is "a specialist free kick taker". He made his debut on the 12th against Poland, a 1–0 loss in Warsaw.

References

External links

Levski official profile

1986 births
Living people
South African people of Portuguese descent
White South African people
Sportspeople from Johannesburg
Portuguese footballers
South African soccer players
Association football defenders
Liga Portugal 2 players
Segunda Divisão players
S.L. Benfica B players
C.D. Trofense players
Portimonense S.C. players
PAS Lamia 1964 players
Cypriot First Division players
Cypriot Second Division players
AEP Paphos FC players
Aris Limassol FC players
Olympiakos Nicosia players
Slovak Super Liga players
MŠK Žilina players
First Professional Football League (Bulgaria) players
PFC Levski Sofia players
Ekstraklasa players
Pogoń Szczecin players
Portugal youth international footballers
South Africa international soccer players
Portuguese expatriate footballers
South African expatriate soccer players
Expatriate footballers in Greece
Expatriate footballers in Cyprus
Expatriate footballers in Slovakia
Expatriate footballers in Bulgaria
Expatriate footballers in Poland
Portuguese expatriate sportspeople in Greece
Portuguese expatriate sportspeople in Cyprus
Portuguese expatriate sportspeople in Slovakia
Portuguese expatriate sportspeople in Bulgaria
Portuguese expatriate sportspeople in Poland
South African expatriate sportspeople in Greece
South African expatriate sportspeople in Cyprus
South African expatriate sportspeople in Slovakia
South African expatriate sportspeople in Bulgaria
South African expatriate sportspeople in Poland